The seventh edition of the Pan Pacific Swimming Championships, a long course (50 m) event, was held in Fukuoka, Japan, from August 10–13, 1997.

Competing nations

Results

Men's events

Legend:

Women's events

Legend:

Notes

References
Results on GBRSports.com
swimrankings

 
Pan Pacific Swimming Championships
Swimming competitions in Japan
Pan
Pan
Pan
Sport in Fukuoka